Lutheran High School Westland is a parochial high school located in Westland, Michigan in Wayne County. It is governed by the Lutheran High School Association of Greater Detroit and is associated with the Lutheran Church–Missouri Synod. Its current enrollment is around 190 students.  The school colors are black and white, and its mascot is the Warrior.

History
Talks began in the mid-1980s to open another Lutheran high school in western Wayne County.  As declining enrollment plagued Lutheran High School East in Harper Woods and Lutheran High School West in Detroit, Westland was selected as the site for the new school.

Building history
The school opened in 1986 in the building that was formerly Nankin Mills Middle School, where singer Alice Cooper attended. A series of city school buildings had been constructed on landfill, and while the sites had been deemed safe, a series of long running legal disputes arose. Cheryl Graunstadt became a member of the Westland city council as a result of her efforts to close down schools built on landfills that were expelling leachate. As part of the ongoing legal disputes, several school buildings, including the Nankin Mills Middle School were sold to private interests. It is unknown if the Lutheran High School Westland building was among those expelling leachate, as no formal statements have been made on the topic.

References

External links

Private high schools in Michigan
Educational institutions established in 1986
Secondary schools affiliated with the Lutheran Church–Missouri Synod
Lutheran schools in Michigan
Schools in Wayne County, Michigan
1986 establishments in Michigan
Westland, Michigan